(born 4 December 1984 in Wakayama) is a Japanese freestyle wrestler. He competed in the 2009 World Wrestling Championships, reaching the round of 16. He competed in the 2011 World Wrestling Championships, reaching the quarterfinals. He competed in the 2012 Summer Olympics, winning a bronze medal.  At the 2012 Summer Olympics, he lost to Vladimer Khinchegashvili in the semi-final.  In the repechage, he defeated Radoslav Velikov in his bronze medal match.

Yumoto's twin brother Kenichi is also an Olympic medal winner in wrestling.

References

External links
 

Living people
1984 births
People from Wakayama Prefecture
Japanese male sport wrestlers
Japan Ground Self-Defense Force personnel
Olympic wrestlers of Japan
Wrestlers at the 2012 Summer Olympics
Olympic bronze medalists for Japan
Olympic medalists in wrestling
Medalists at the 2012 Summer Olympics
Twin sportspeople
Japanese twins
Asian Wrestling Championships medalists
21st-century Japanese people
20th-century Japanese people